The 2013 FIL European Luge Championships took place under the auspices of the International Luge Federation at Oberhof, Germany from 12 to 13 January 2013.

Medalists

Medal table

References

FIL European Luge Championships
FIL European Luge Championships
FIL European Luge Championships
Luge in Germany
International sports competitions hosted by Germany
January 2013 sports events in Germany